Unmanned aerial photogrammetric survey is the use of unmanned aerial vehicles (UAVs) to take photos for use in photogrammetry, the science of making measurements from photographs. Instruments manufactured for UAVs could be mounted on unmanned flying platforms of various sizes and types, such as octocopters. These machines are suitable for the full geodetic survey of a study site by creating a point cloud of measurements of nearly homogeneous quality and accuracy. These detailed point clouds (of various types of data) could be used in line with orthophotos etc. to obtain a complex data system representing the study site.

Similarly to manned aerial surveys, UAVs are suitable to acquire three-dimensional digital models and orthophoto mosaics for a certain area.

The biggest downside of this technology is that these UAVs, especially the smaller ones, could survey only a smaller area.

Comparison with manned aerial survey

Disadvantages
 Smaller UAVs are only able to survey smaller areas.
 The payload of the flying platforms is quite limited.
 The legal procedures are more complicated and lengthy than the ones for manned aerial vehicles (e.g. aeroplanes, kites).
 Reliable flying platforms of good quality are very expensive

Advantages
 The machinery could be transported to the study site by car, thus transportation costs are low.
 The deployment of the machinery is flexible.
 It can operate and produce measurements in cloudy conditions.
 The maintenance, storage and running costs of unmanned platforms are cheaper than the same expenses of conventional aircraft. Moreover, the smaller high quality unmanned platforms are more efficient, productive and more durable than the conventional unmanned aircraft which could amortize quickly

References

See also 
 OpenDroneMap

Photogrammetry
Unmanned aerial vehicles